José Olivares (born 8 January 1997) is a Dominican tennis player.

Olivares has a career high ATP singles ranking of 605 achieved on 28 October 2019. He also has a career high ATP doubles ranking of 689 achieved on 20 November 2017.

Olivares represents the Dominican Republic in the Davis Cup. He was first nominated to the team for the 2014 Davis Cup and has played in matches against Marcelo Tomás Barrios Vera, Hans Podlipnik-Castillo, and Juan Sebastián Cabal.

References

External links
 
 
 

1997 births
Living people
Dominican Republic male tennis players
Central American and Caribbean Games medalists in tennis
Central American and Caribbean Games gold medalists for the Dominican Republic
Central American and Caribbean Games silver medalists for the Dominican Republic